Geranium vulcanicola is a plant species native to central Mexico. Type locale is on the slopes of Ixtaccíhuatl (also spelled Iztaccíhuatl) Volcano east of Mexico City, on the boundary of the State of México and the State of Puebla.

Geranium vulcanicola is a perennial herb. Stems are spreading or decumbent, up to 40 cm (16 inches) long. Leaves are palmately 3-5-lobed, kidney-shaped to pentagonal in general outline, up to 4 cm (1.6 inches) across. Sepals are green, up to 7 mm (0.3 inches) long, tipped with awns. Petals are white, slightly long than the sepals.

References

vulcanicola
Endemic flora of Mexico
Flora of Puebla
Flora of the State of Mexico
Taxa named by John Kunkel Small